The 1965–66 Regionalliga  was the third season of the Regionalliga, the second tier of the German football league system. The league operated in five regional divisions, Berlin, North, South, Southwest and West. The five league champions and four runners-up, the Regionalliga Berlin runners-up was not qualified, entered a promotion play-off to determine the two clubs to move up to the Bundesliga for the next season. The two promotion spots went to the Regionalliga West champions Fortuna Düsseldorf and runners-up Rot-Weiß Essen.

Regionalliga Nord
The 1965–66 season saw two new clubs in the league, Bremer SV and Itzehoer SV, both promoted from the Amateurliga, while no club had been relegated from the Bundesliga to the league.

Regionalliga Berlin
The 1965–66 season saw seven new clubs in the league, 1. FC Neukölln, VfB Hermsdorf, Lichterfelder SU, SC Tegel, SC Gatow and SC Staaken, all promoted from the Amateurliga as the Regionalliga had been expanded from 10 to 16 clubs, while Hertha BSC Berlin had been relegated from the Bundesliga to the league.

Regionalliga West
The 1965–66 season saw two new clubs in the league, VfL Bochum and VfB Bottrop, both promoted from the Amateurliga, while no club had been relegated from the Bundesliga to the league.

Regionalliga Südwest
The 1965–66 season saw one new club in the league, SV Alsenborn, promoted from the Amateurliga, while no club had been relegated from the Bundesliga to the league.

Regionalliga Süd
The 1965–66 season saw three new clubs in the league, Opel Rüsselsheim, VfR Pforzheim and SpVgg Weiden, all promoted from the Amateurliga, while no club had been relegated from the Bundesliga to the league.

Bundesliga promotion round

Qualifying
The runners-up of the Regionalliga Nord and Regionalliga Südwest played a two-leg decider to determine which team qualified for the group stage, which 1. FC Saarbrücken won on aggregate.

|}

Group 1

Group 2

References

Sources
 30 Jahre Bundesliga  30th anniversary special, publisher: kicker Sportmagazin, published: 1993
 kicker-Almanach 1990  Yearbook of German football, publisher: kicker Sportmagazin, published: 1989, 
 DSFS Liga-Chronik seit 1945  publisher: DSFS, published: 2005

External links
Regionalliga on the official DFB website 
kicker 
Das Deutsche Fussball Archiv  Historic German league tables

1965-66
2
Ger